Kim Hill  (born 1955) is a New Zealand broadcaster who currently presents the programme Saturday Morning on Radio New Zealand National, a public radio station. She was named International Radio Personality of the Year in 2012.

Background 
Hill was born in 1955 in Shropshire, England. Her father was a veterinarian and her mother was a physiotherapist and nurse. When Hill was 15, her family emigrated to New Zealand. Hill gained a BA in French and German at Massey University and the University of Otago. She then studied journalism at the University of Canterbury's Postgraduate School of Journalism.

Journalism and broadcast career 

Her early career included stints working for radio and newspapers in Nelson, Greymouth and Gisborne, before moving to Radio New Zealand in Wellington and starting on the programme Checkpoint. From 1993 to 2002 she was the host of the daily morning Nine to Noon programme. Notable interviews from this time included the Dalai Lama, Nelson Mandela, Jeffrey Archer, and Monica Lewinsky.

In April 2002, Hill began hosting Saturday Morning. Since the 1990s she has also worked in television (on the consumer affairs show Fair Go and news programme Counterpoint, both with TVNZ's TV ONE) and in 2003 she began hosting the interview programme Face to Face With Kim Hill.

In 2003 Hill interviewed journalist John Pilger who complained that Hill had not researched properly, saying "You waste my time because you have not prepared for this interview, as any journalist does, and I've done many interviews. The one thing is to prepare for them and this interview, frankly, is a disgrace." Referring to the Australian journalist in 2012 she said "The thing is, if Pilger wasn’t an egomaniac, he wouldn’t have done the work he’s done. I was keen to talk to him, but he turns out to be a prick. So it goes."

In 2006, Hill hosted Are Angels OK, a series of programmes where artists, writers, and physicists discussed the intersection between physics and the arts. Her monthly radio conversations between 2004 and 2007 with physicist Sir Paul Callaghan were published as As Far As We Know.

Awards 
In 2017 Hill was awarded a Gold Radio Award for Best Radio Personality: Network/Syndicated at the International Radio Program Awards. In 2012 Hill was awarded "International Radio Personality of the Year" by the Association for International Broadcasting. The judges described her as "an experienced and warm broadcaster exercising full control of her content, whilst coaxing her guests to reveal more of themselves; really enjoyable live and sparky content that demonstrates what is great about radio, and illustrates how important lightness of touch is in speech content." In 2000, Hill was awarded a Bravo award by the New Zealand Skeptics for her interview of John Read, Director of Scientific Affairs of the NZ Psychological Society on National Radio. Hill is also a Companion of the Royal Society of New Zealand.

See also
 List of New Zealand television personalities

References

External links

 Kim Hill at Radio New Zealand National

1955 births
New Zealand television presenters
New Zealand television journalists
New Zealand radio journalists
New Zealand radio presenters
New Zealand women radio presenters
English emigrants to New Zealand
Massey University alumni
University of Otago alumni
Living people
RNZ National
Companions of the Royal Society of New Zealand